In taxonomy, Methanofollis is a genus of the Methanomicrobiaceae.

Description and significance 
Methanofollis ("a methane-producing bag") is a non-motile, Gram-negative, obligately anaerobic, mesophilic archaeon that produces methane. It grows between the temperatures 20–45 °C (optimum 34–40 °C), and at the pH of around 7.

Genome structure 
The genome of the archaeon has not yet sequenced. The G + C content of the DNA is determined to be 60.0%.

Cell structure and metabolism 
The cells of Methanofollis are highly irregular cocci, with diameter of 1.25–2.0 µm. The major polar lipids are phospholipids, glycolipids, and phosphoglycolipids. It utilizes H2/CO2, formate, 2-propanol/CO2, and 2-butanol/CO2 for growth and methanogenesis. No growth has been observed on acetate, trimethylamine, methanol, ethanol, 2-propanol, isobutanol, or 2-butanol as catabolic substrates.

Ecology 
Most species of the archaeon are isolated from anaerobic high-rate wastewater bioreactors or solfataric fields. For example, M. tationis was isolated from a solfataric field on Mount Tatio in the Atacama desert in northern Chile.

Phylogeny
The currently accepted taxonomy is based on the List of Prokaryotic names with Standing in Nomenclature (LPSN) and National Center for Biotechnology Information (NCBI).

See also
 List of Archaea genera

References

Further reading

Scientific journals

Scientific books

Scientific databases

External links

Methanofollis at BacDive -  the Bacterial Diversity Metadatabase

Archaea genera
Euryarchaeota